Arash Talebinejad (born 1981) is a retired football player. Talebinejad has represented the Swedish national football team.

Career statistics

References

External links
Brommapojkarna har värvat Arash Talebinejad från norska Tromsö 
 

1981 births
Living people
Iranian emigrants to Sweden
Iranian footballers
Swedish footballers
Sweden under-21 international footballers
Sweden youth international footballers
Allsvenskan players
Superettan players
Ettan Fotboll players
Eliteserien players
Västra Frölunda IF players
AIK Fotboll players
Tromsø IL players
IF Brommapojkarna players
Swedish expatriate footballers
Iranian expatriate footballers
Swedish expatriate sportspeople in Norway
Expatriate footballers in Norway
Gröndals IK players
Sportspeople of Iranian descent
Association football midfielders
People from Hormozgan Province